Lipayran is a small inhabited island in the Don group, to the south west of Bantayan Island in the Philippines.

References

Islands of the Don group (Bantayan)